Lowell Public Schools is a school district headquartered in the Henry J. Mroz Central Administration Offices at the Edith Nourse Rogers School in Lowell, Massachusetts.

In 1987 Mary Jane Mullen, a guidance counselor at the school district, stated on WGBH-TV that around 1977 there were significant numbers of Latinos and Greek speaking people, and that by 1987 there were still significant numbers of Latinos but that there were no longer significant numbers of Greek-speaking students. By 1987 the district received an influx of Cambodian students.

Schools
Schools include:

High School in Lowell, MA
 Lowell High School (9-12)

K-8 Schools in Lowell, MA
 Joseph G. Pyne Arts Magnet School
 Bartlett Community Partnership School

Middle Schools In Lowell, MA
(5-8)
 Benjamin F. Butler Middle School
 Dr. An Wang Middle School named for An Wang co-founder of Wang Laboratories.
 H.J. Robinson Middle School
 James S. Daley Middle School
 Kathryn P. Stoklosa Middle School
 James F. Sullivan Middle School of Communications

Primary Schools in Lowell, MA
PreK-4
 Abraham Lincoln Elementary School
 Charlotte M. Murkland Elementary School
 Greenhalge Elementary School
 Pawtucketville Memorial Elementary School
 S. Christa McAuliffe Elementary School
 John J. Shaughnessy Elementary School
 Washington Elementary School
 C.W. Morey Elementary School
 Dr. Gertrude M. Bailey Elementary School
 Joseph A. McAvinnue Elementary School

K-4 Schools in Lowell, MA
 Moody Elementary School
 Peter W. Reilly Elementary School

References

External links

 

Education in Lowell, Massachusetts
School districts in Massachusetts